Stefano Bertacco (29 December 1962 – 14 June 2020) was an Italian politician who was an Italian Senator from 2014 until his death in 2020.

Political career 
Bertacco first became a member of the Italian Senate when Elisabetta Casellati left and Bertacco took her seat in the legislature. Bertacco was re-elected at the 2018 general election in the single-member district of Villafranca di Verona.

Bertacco died on 14 June 2020 after a long illness. A by-election was held to replace Bertacco in September 2020 and was won by Luca De Carlo.

References 

1962 births
2020 deaths
Politicians from Verona
Senators of Legislature XVII of Italy
Senators of Legislature XVIII of Italy
Forza Italia (2013) politicians
The People of Freedom politicians
National Alliance (Italy) politicians
Brothers of Italy politicians